Swarts fluorination is a process whereby the chlorine atoms in a compound – generally an organic compound, but experiments have been performed using silanes – are replaced with fluorine, by treatment with antimony trifluoride in the presence of chlorine or of antimony pentachloride. Some metal fluorides are particularly more useful than others, including silver(I) fluoride, mercurous fluoride, cobalt(II) fluoride and aforementioned antimony. 

Heating the mixture of the metal fluoride and the haloalkane (chlorine and bromine are replaced readily) yields the desired fluoro-alkane. In some particularly reactive cases, heating is unnecessary; shaking or stirring the reaction mixture is sufficient. This reaction has a good yield. 

The active species is antimony trifluorodichloride, which is produced in situ; this compound can also be produced in bulk, according to a patent of John Weaver.

The process was initially described by Frédéric Jean Edmond Swarts in 1892.

References

Halogenation reactions
Substitution reactions
Name reactions